Geoffrey Keating (c. 1569 – c. 1644) was a 17th-century Irish historian. He was born in County Tipperary, Ireland, and is buried in Tubrid Graveyard in the parish of Ballylooby-Duhill. He became a Catholic priest and a poet.

Biography
It was generally believed until recently that Keating had been born in Burgess, County Tipperary; indeed, a monument to Keating was raised beside the bridge at Burgess, in 1990; but Diarmuid Ó Murchadha writes,

In November 1603, he was one of forty students who sailed for Bordeaux under the charge of the Rev. Diarmaid MacCarthy to begin their studies at the Irish College which had just been founded in that city by Cardinal François de Sourdis, Archbishop of Bordeaux. On his arrival in France he wrote Farewell to Ireland, and upon hearing of the Flight of the Earls wrote Lament on the Sad State of Ireland. After obtaining the degree of Doctor of Divinity at the University of Bordeaux he returned about 1610 to Ireland and was appointed to the cure of souls at Uachtar Achaidh in the parish of Knockgraffan, near Cahir, where he put a stop to the then-common practice of delaying Mass until the neighbouring gentry arrived.

His major work, Foras Feasa ar Éirinn (Foundation of Knowledge on Ireland, more usually translated History of Ireland), was written in Early Modern Irish and completed c. 1634.

The Foras Feasa traced the history of Ireland from the creation of the world to the invasion of the Normans in the 12th century, based on the rich native historical and mythological traditions (including that of the Milesians), Irish bardic poetry, monastic annals, and other ecclesiastical records. The Foras Feasa circulated in manuscript, as Ireland's English administration would not give authority to have it printed because of its pro-Catholic arguments. It was still a time of repression; in 1634 a political campaign for a general reform of anti-Catholic religious persecution, known as the Graces, was denied by the viceroy.

Having Old English ancestry, Keating held the political view that Ireland's nobility and natural leadership derived from the surviving Irish clan chiefs and Old English landed families who had remained Catholic. He also accepted the House of Stuart as lawful kings of Ireland, which had a long-term influence on both Irish Confederate and Jacobites until Papal recognition of the Stuart claim finally ended in 1766. Keating continued to influence Irish genealogical writers such as John O'Hart into the 1800s.

Works

Edited and translated works:

For a list of editions, translations, and manuscripts see Foras Feasa ar Éirinn

References

Sources

External links
The History of Ireland (English Translation) with memoir, notes and genealogies at The Ex-Classics Web Site

Irish chroniclers
Irish poets
16th-century Irish-language poets
17th-century Irish-language poets
17th-century Irish Roman Catholic priests
Irish-language writers
University of Bordeaux alumni
People of Elizabethan Ireland
Poet priests
Irish people of Norman descent
People from County Tipperary
17th-century deaths
17th-century Irish historians
Irish genealogists
1560s births
1640s deaths